Ilias  is the Greek version of the name of the Prophet Elijah. It is also commonly spelled Elias.

Notable people with the name include:
 Akhtaruzzaman Ilias (1943–1997), Bangladeshi novelist and short story writer
 Ilias Ali (born 1959), Indian politician
 Ilias Ali (born 1961), Bangladeshi politician
 Ilias Anastasakos (born 1978), Greek footballer
 Ilias Atmatsidis (born 1969), a former Greek football goalkeeper
 Iliaș Colceag (fl. before 1710–1743), Moldavian mercenary and military commander in the Ottoman and Russian Empire
 Ilias Gorchkhanov (1967–2005), the first leader of the Ingush Jamaat
 Ilias Haddad (born 1989 in Nador), Moroccan footballer
 Ilias Hatzipavlis (Ηλίας Χατζηπαυλής) (born 24 May 1949), a Greek sailor
 Ilias Iliadis (Ηλίας Ηλιάδης. born Jarji Zviadauri. ჯარჯი ზვიადაური. on 10 November 1986), a Georgian-born judoka competing for Greece
 Ilias Iliadis (born 2001), Greek-Canadian footballer
 Ilias Iliou (1904–1985), member of the Greek Parliament and leader of the United Democratic Left
 Ilias Ioannou (born 1979), football (soccer) player who plays for Kerkyra F.C. in Greek First Division
 Ilias Kafetzis, Greek athlete who competed at the 1896 Summer Olympics in Athens
 Ilias Kotsios (Greek: Ηλίας Κώτσιος) (born 25 April 1977 in Larissa, Greece), a football defender
 Ilias Kyriakidis (born 1985 in Athens), Greek football player currently playing for Ergotelis
 Ilias Kyriazakis (born 1960 in Veroia, Greece), veterinarian, UK-based academic, holder of numerous scientific awards and honours
 Ilias Kyriazis (Greek: Ηλίας Κυριαζής, born 1978), born in 1978 in Athens, Greece, a comic book writer and artist
 Ilias Lalaounis (1920–2013), Greek jewelry designer
 Ilias Louka (born 1974), retired Cypriot shot putter
 Ilias Manikas (born 1980 in Greece), football striker, currently playing for Rodos F.C.
 Ilias Melkas (Greek: Ηλίας Μέλκας, born 1989), an Albanian footballer for Iraklis Thessaloniki F.C.
 Ilias Mihalopoulos (born 1985), Greek footballer for Asteras Tripolis FC
 Bille Ilias Mohamed (born 30 November 1987), one of two Swedish citizens of Somali descent who were convicted of conspiracy to commit terrorist crime in Gothenburg, Sweden, in 2010
 Elias Pavlidis (born 1978), Greek amateur boxer who competed at the Athens Olympics 2004
 Ilias Polatidis (1966–2016). (Ηλίας Πολατίδης. born 1966), a member of the Popular Orthodox Rally
 Ilias Poursanidis (born 1972 in Athens), former Greek footballer
 Ilias Rosidis (1927–2019). (Ηλίας Ρωσίδης, Greece), footballer for Olympiacos FC and the Greece national team
 Ilias Solakis (born 1974), Greek footballer for Olympiakos Volou in Greek Superleague
 Ilias Stogiannis (born 1976 in Kozani, Greece), professional football goalkeeper for Rodos F.C.
 Ilias Tsirimokos (1907–1968). (Ηλίας Τσιριμώκος. 1907–14 July 1968), a Greek politician
 Ilias Venezis (1904–1973), a major Greek novelist
 Ilias Vrioni (1882–1932), served as Prime Minister of Albania three times
 Ilias Yfantis (born 1936), Greek footballer for Olympiacos F.C. during the 1950s and 60s
 Ilias Zeytulaev (born 1984), Uzbek footballer for Lanciano in the Lega Pro Prima Divisione
 Ilias Zouros (alternate spelling: Elias Zouros, born March 11, 1966), Greek basketball coach

fictional characters:
 Leo Ilias, a character in the manga Saint Seiya: The Lost Canvas by Shiori Teshirogi

Greek masculine given names